Thug by Nature is the debut solo studio album by American rapper Layzie Bone, released under his L-Burna alias. It was released on March 20, 2001 through Ruthless Records with distribution via Epic Records. Production was handled by L.T. Hutton, Darren Vegas, Michael Seifert, BB, Buddy Banks, Damon Elliott, Red Spyda, Dre' Ghost, Mauly T., Step and Thin C., with Tomica Wright and Layzie Bone serving as executive producers. It features guest appearances from Aaron Hall, Baby S, Big Chan, Dekumpozed, Flesh-n-Bone, WC and Geraldine Sigler. The album peaked at number 43 on the Billboard 200 and number 17 on the Top R&B/Hip-Hop Albums, with 36,406 copies sold in the United States in the first week. It also made it to number 30 on the Official New Zealand Music Chart.

"Battlefield" and "Deadly Musical" are diss songs aimed at Chicago-based group Do Or Die.

The song "Back Up Against The Wall" is featured on the Soundtrack of Down to Earth.

Track listing

Bonus disc
Bonus disc 1
"It's all Hood Niggaz"
"M.O.G."

Bonus disc 2
"Money on da Wood" (featuring Bizzy Bone, Skant Bone and E-Mortal Thugs)
"No Matter"

Personnel

Steven "Layzie Bone"/"L-Burna" Howse – main artist, executive producer
Geraldine 'Gere' Sigler – vocals (track 1)
William "WC" Calhoun – featured artist (track 3)
Brence "Dekumpozed" Skinner – featured artist (track 5)
Aaron Hall – featured artist (track 10)
Stanley "Flesh-n-Bone" Howse – featured artist (track 12)
"Big Chan" Gaines – featured artist (track 12)
David "Baby S" Ware – featured artist (track 13)
Michael Seifert – producer & recording (tracks: 1, 19)
Lenton Terrell Hutton – producer (tracks: 2, 4, 5, 7, 14)
Darren "Vegas" Hubbard – producer (tracks: 3, 12, 15, 18)
Edward "Buddy" Banks – producer (track 8)
Amefika "Thin C" Williams – producer (track 8)
Mauly Taylor – producer (track 10)
Andre "Dre Ghost" Bell – producer (track 11)
Step – producer (track 13)
BB – producer (track 16)
Red Spyda – producer (track 16)
Damon Elliott – producer & recording (track 17)
Aaron Connor – mixing (tracks: 1, 3, 8, 11-13, 15, 16, 18)
Brian Springer – recording (tracks: 2, 4, 5, 7), mixing (tracks: 2, 4, 7, 14)
Richard E. Harris Jr. – recording (tracks: 3, 8, 15, 18, 19)
Gabe Chiesa – recording (tracks: 4, 7)
Erik Nordquist – recording (tracks: 11, 17)
Dino "The Cut" Johnson – recording (track 13)
Tim Nitz – recording (track 14)
"Disco Rick" Taylor – recording (track 16)
Michael Dean – mixing (track 17)
Eric Williams – recording (track 19)
Jason Walker – engineering assistant (track 10)
Joe Brown – engineering assistant (track 17)
Tomica Wright – executive producer
Giulio Costanzo – art direction, design
Image Lumumba – photography

Charts

References

External links

2001 debut albums
Layzie Bone albums
Ruthless Records albums
Albums produced by L.T. Hutton